Awake is the seventh studio album by American Christian rock band Skillet. It is the follow-up to their Grammy-nominated album Comatose. The album was released on August 25, 2009, by Lava Records, Ardent Records and Atlantic Records and debuted at No. 2 on the Billboard 200. The album was certified gold by the Recording Industry Association of America (RIAA) on July 27, 2010, and has since gone double platinum, selling over 2,000,000 copies to date. It was nominated for Top Christian Album at the Billboard Music Awards 2011 and won. This is the last album to feature guitarist Ben Kasica and the first studio release to feature drummer Jen Ledger. The singles "Awake and Alive", "Hero", and "Monster" are certified 2x Platinum, 3x Platinum, and 5x Platinum, respectively.

Background
Skillet began recording for the album around October 2008. The band recorded at Bay7 Studios in Los Angeles, California, with Howard Benson as the band's producer.  The album contains 12 songs. Lead singer John Cooper wrote more than 40 songs in preparation. He said that there was much pressure while recording the album: "Every time you do a record, there's pressure because you want to outdo the last record. This time it was intensified because the last project was so successful."

Musical style
According to band members, the album is similar to their 2006 release Comatose, featuring strings and guitars with a harder rock sound than their previous album. John Cooper said that it "sounds like Skillet with some new things people may not expect." On Skillet's website, they describe their musical style as "Classic rock riffs, swirling drums, monstrous hooks, and undeniably catchy choruses... hints of old school progressive rock mixed in with modern alternative flourishes... touches of classical influence as swelling strings intersect with sonic adrenaline rushes."

Release and promotion
The band finished the first leg of their Awake and Alive Tour in support of Awake, which opened on September 24, 2009 in Fort Wayne, Indiana and encompassing 52 cities between September and December. They were accompanied by The Letter Black, Decyfer Down, and Hawk Nelson on the tour. The band recently finished the second leg of the tour with RED and The Letter Black in April. They also toured with tobyMac and House of Heroes on the Awake Tonight Tour in March and April, and will resume the tour in November and December.

Awake was released on August 25, 2009, through Lava/INO Records, and debuted at No. 2 on the national U.S. Billboard 200 chart, making it the band's most successful entry on the chart. It also placed on other Billboard magazine charts as No. 1 on Top Alternative Albums, No. 2 on Top Rock Albums, and No. 1 on the Top Christian Albums listing. The album sold 68,000 copies in its first week, Skillet's best-selling and highest charting opening week to date.

In 2009, Awake tied Underoath's Define the Great Line, and Casting Crowns's The Altar and the Door for the highest charting Christian rock album on the Billboard 200, debuting at No. 2.

The song "Awake and Alive" also charted on the Billboard Hot 100 at No. 100 and No. 16 on the Heatseakers charts. It was Skillet's first song to chart on the Hot 100. The song was released to Christian CHR and rock radio in February 2010.

"Monster" and "Hero" were used on the soundtrack of the WWE SmackDown vs. Raw 2010 video game, with "Monster" also being used for 2009's WWE Hell in a Cell PPV and "Hero" being used for the 2009 Tribute to the Troops show and 2010's Royal Rumble pay-per-view. The Cleveland, Ohio AHL hockey team Cleveland Monsters use "Monster" for their goal song and game-opener, the AHL hockey team Portland Pirates also use "Hero" for their game opener before the team skates onto the ice.

"Awake and Alive" was used by ABC's daytime drama One Life to Live as part of the show's November Sweeps Promo in November 2009 as well as in promos for the MLB's National League and American League Playoff Series.

"Hero" was used in commercials for Sunday Night Football, and is currently being used in commercials for the NBA on TNT and NHL's Los Angeles Kings and St. Louis Blues on Fox Sports West and Fox Sports Midwest, respectively. It was also used for the theme song to WWE's Tribute to the Troops event in 2009.

The Pittsburgh Pirates used "Awake and Alive" in the team's Opening Day video for 2011.

The rock radio mix of "Awake and Alive" was chosen to appear on the soundtrack to Transformers: Dark of the Moon.

 "Hero" was released as the album's lead single on May 19, 2009.
 "Monster" was released to mainstream rock radio on July 14, 2009.
 "Awake and Alive" was released to Christian CHR and Rock radio on February 15, 2010.
 "Forgiven" was released to Christian CHR/Rock on August 2, 2010, according to All Access.
 "Lucy" was announced to be released to Christian CHR on January 27, 2011.
 "It's Not Me, It's You" was released as the sixth single on June 7, 2011.
 "One Day Too Late" was released as the seventh single on October 10, 2011.

Reception

The album received mixed reviews from critics. Kevin Chamberlin of Jesus Freak Hideout gave the album 3 out of 5 stars, saying that the album "doesn't live up to Comatose and due to its extreme proximity style-wise, it is lackluster at best and on the verge of uninteresting." He also stated that the heavy amount of ballads on the album were unacceptable, saying that a few songs "wear immaturity like a fedora." He concluded his review by saying that the album "feels like the sophomore slump that Skillet never had to suffer through and a watered down version of  Comatose." Despite this, Awake has since gone double platinum in the United States, selling over 2,000,000 copies to date and outperforming Comatose.

Track listing

Personnel 
Skillet
 John L. Cooper – vocals, bass guitar, additional string arrangements
 Korey Cooper – keyboards, programming, keyboard programming, backing vocals, string arrangements
 Ben Kasica – electric guitars, acoustic guitars
 Jen Ledger – drums, vocals (1, 4)

Additional credits

 Howard Benson – additional keyboards, producer 
 Jonathan Chu – violin (4, 9, 12)
 Zachary Kelm – executive producer, management
 Mike Plotnikoff – recording
 Hatsukazu Inagaki – additional engineer
 Keith Armstrong – assistant engineer
 Nik Karpen – assistant engineer
 Chris Lord-Alge – mixing at Mix LA (Los Angeles, California)
 Andrew Schubert – additional mix engineer 
 Brad Townsend – additional mix engineer 
 Paul DeCarli – digital editing
 Ben Kasica – additional post-production editing 
 Chris Concepcion – technical assistance
 Ted Jensen – mastering at Sterling Sound (New York City, New York)
 Marc Vangool – guitar technician 
 Jon Nicholson – drum technician 
 Andy Kemp – A&R direction 
 Anne Declemente – A&R administration 
 Kristie Borgmann – art manager
 Mark Obriski – art direction, design 
 David Molnar – photography 
 Christin Cook – hair stylist, make-up
 Emily Sistrunk – stylist
 Anthony Della – marketing direction

Charts

Year-end album charts

Decade-end charts

Singles

Certifications

Awards
The album was nominated for the following awards at the 41st GMA Dove Awards:

Billboard Music Awards 2011

References

External links
 Album page at Skillet's official website

Skillet (band) albums
2009 albums
Albums produced by Howard Benson